The 2003 West Lancashire District Council election took place on 1 May 2003 to elect members of West Lancashire District Council in Lancashire, England. One third of the council was up for election and the Conservative Party stayed in overall control of the council.

After the election, the composition of the council was:

Campaign
Before the election the Conservatives held 30 seats compared to 24 for the Labour Party, after the Conservatives gained a majority in the 2002 election for the first time since 1991. 18 seats were contested in the election with the Conservatives defending 11 and Labour 7. In total 46 candidates stood in the election, made up of 18 Conservative, 17 Labour, 4 Green and 7 independent candidates. No Liberal Democrats stood in the election, with their local party reported to have fewer than 100 members. Among the councillors defending their seats in the election was the Conservative council leader, Geoffrey Roberts, while a former Labour councillor John Fillis stood as in independent in Scott ward, after having been cleared earlier in the year of defrauding Labour party accounts during the 1997 general election.

The election was seen as being a close contest being the Conservative and Labour parties, but the Liverpool Echo felt apathy among Labour voters could imperil some Labour held seats in Skelmersdale. The Conservatives defended their record in control of the council for the past year, pointing to a recycling scheme they had introduced, improvements they claimed to have made in street cleaning and they pledged to continue investing in services. However Labour attacked the Conservatives for scrapping a community warden scheme, pledged that they would end a pest control charge and would provide a new cemetery for the area. Labour also accused the Conservatives of planning to privatise services to a Liverpool company, however this was denied by the Conservatives.

Election result
The results saw the Conservatives remain in control of the council despite losing 2 seats to Labour. Labour narrowly gained seats in Scott and Wrightington wards from the Conservative after a recount. This meant the Conservatives only had a majority of 2, with 28 seats compared to 26 for Labour. No other candidates were elected with all 7 independents being defeated. Overall turnout in the election was 27.5%.

Ward results

Ashurst

Aughton and Downholland

Aughton Park

Bickerstaffe

Birch Green

Derby

Digmoor

Knowlsey

North Meols

Parbold

Scarisbrick

Scott

Skelmersdale North

Skelmersdale South

Tanhouse

Tarleton

Up Holland

Wrightington

References

2003
2003 English local elections
2000s in Lancashire